North Wales is a borough in Montgomery County, Pennsylvania. It is a suburb of Philadelphia and is one of the three historic population centers that make up the North Penn Valley, which is centered on the borough of Lansdale. The population was 3,426 as of the 2020 census.

Like many small boroughs in Pennsylvania, North Wales' boundaries have not kept pace with population growth. In similar fashion, many businesses and residences with North Wales addresses are located in outlying townships that were never annexed by the borough, such as the Montgomery Mall in Montgomery Township. North Wales is in the North Penn School District.

History
As its name suggests, North Wales was settled by Welsh immigrants who named it after North Wales in Wales (for more on Welsh settlements in colonial Pennsylvania, see "Welsh Tract"). Part of a 1702 William Penn land grant, this rich farming country was given the name "Gwynedd" for the homeland of the earliest settlers and it began as a pastoral village in agricultural Gwynedd Township.

Before 1850, a number of farms, plus a 1776 church, shared by the Lutheran and Reformed congregations, dotted the present borough's landscape. What is now Main Street was originally an old Indian trail, and was laid out as the Great Road in 1728. By 1828, it had become today's Sumneytown Pike, and was a toll road until 1914.  It had always been an important route to Philadelphia, and continues to serve as a connection to Routes 202 and 309 to the east and the Northeastern Extension of the Pennsylvania Turnpike to the west.

Its rural character was abruptly disrupted by the building of the North Pennsylvania Railroad starting in 1852. Service from Bethlehem to Philadelphia through North Wales began in 1857. The town quickly grew around the railroad station, with hotels and restaurants lining Walnut Street and Main Street within walking distance. North Wales is the oldest of the North Penn boroughs, incorporated in 1869, by taking land from today's Upper Gwynedd Township, then the northern portion of Gwynedd Township.

Some of the large homes at the start of the 20th century were opened to summer guests from the city. "Idlewilde", still present on Main Street, hosted the Emperor of Brazil, Dom Pedro II, when he was visiting Philadelphia to open the 1876 U.S. Centennial Exhibition with President Ulysses S. Grant.

During the late 19th and early 20th centuries, much of North Wales borough's housing was built. Most houses along South Main Street between Montgomery and Prospects Streets remain much as they were when built and are lovingly maintained.  The borough also features a variety of single family homes, as well as twins, and rowhomes.

Between 1900 and 1926, Lehigh Valley Transit Company operated its Chestnut Hill Branch trolley line, which connected North Wales to surrounding towns through service to either Philadelphia or Allentown. The trolley ran down Main Street through the borough, but detoured onto Pennsylvania Avenue for two blocks to enable it to cross the North Penn Railroad on a bridge.  The bridge was required because the railroad, citing safety concerns, refused to allow the trolleys to cross at the Main Street grade crossing.  Lehigh Valley Transit Company's combined passenger/freight station was located on the north (east) side of Pennsylvania Avenue between Shearer Street and Montgomery Avenue.  After Main Street trolley service ended in 1926, Lehigh Valley Transit high-speed trolleys continued to serve the Wales Junction station, located on Sumneytown Pike three-quarters of a mile west of town.  High-speed trolley serviced ended in September 1951.

In 2000, the North Wales Historic Preservation District was established by Borough Council and the Pennsylvania Historic and Museum Commission to protect the architecture that is a visual reminder of the borough's past. It is the first Historic District in the North Penn boroughs.

Business district
North Wales' Main and Walnut Streets have been home to many businesses over the town's history; they still provide services such as hair salons and beauty parlors, doctors' offices, a dry cleaner, a running and walking shoe specialty store, a yoga studio, two auto repair facilities and auto body shops, two laundromats, a post office, convenience store, and a recording studio. Eateries and bars include two pizza parlors, a Tex-Mex restaurant, two cafés, a bakery, a protein-shake café and a vegan restaurant.

Education

North Wales Elementary School is part of the North Penn School District. The building was North Wales High School from 1927 until North Penn High School was built in the 1950s; it then became an elementary school. The original elementary school from the 1900s was located at the current site of Borough Hall.

Mater Dei Catholic School in Lansdale, of the Roman Catholic Archdiocese of Philadelphia. In January 2012, the archdiocese announced that St. Rose of Lima would merge with St. Stanislaus Parish School in Lansdale, with students attending classes in Lansdale.

Library

North Wales Elementary School formerly housed the North Wales Memorial Free Library from 1927 to 2009.  Due to the growing number of students at school, as well as the library's need for more space, the library purchased and relocated to a much larger (10,000 ft2, over 900 m2) building at 233 South Swartley Street. They began operating with limited hours at the new location on January 4, 2010, and had their grand opening in April 2010 with full hours, including Saturday. The library has also changed its name to "North Wales Area Library" upon its move. It is part of the Montgomery County Library System.

Parks and recreation

Weingartner Park is located at Second and Summit Streets. It has paths, benches and shady trees. The Wee Wailers park, a children's playground, is on Shearer St.

Second Street Park, at Second Street and Prospect Avenue, is a public tennis court area.

The clay totem poles were made by residents.

Eighth Street Park, also known as "A Child's Garden," was developed by local children. It has a brick walking path, plantings and benches.

Ninth Street Park, at Ninth and Church Streets, is a watershed runoff area designed to attract birds. There is a trail with footbridge over the drainage area; it is a natural-feeling area.

Demographics

As of the 2017 census, the borough was 87.1% White, 5.1% Black or African American, 0% Native American, 5.02% Asian, and 4.92% were two or more races. 1.66% of the population were of Hispanic or Latino ancestry.

As of the census of 2017, there were 3,250 people, 1,320 households, and 869 families residing in the borough. The population density was 5,848.7 people per square mile (2,263.8/km2). There were 1,330 housing units at an average density of 2,327.6 per square mile (900.9/km2). The racial makeup of the borough was 90.31% White, 1.32% African American, 0.06% Native American, 2.09% Asian, 0.18% Pacific Islander, 0.78% from other races, and 1.77% from two or more races. Hispanic or Latino of any race were 1.50% of the population.

There were 1,320 households, out of which 34.6% had children under the age of 18 living with them, 53.9% were married couples living together, 9.1% had a female householder with no husband present, and 33.1% were non-families. 27.8% of all households were made up of individuals, and 8.8% had someone living alone who was 65 years of age or older. The average household size was 2.56 and the average family size was 3.18.

In the borough the population was spread out, with 26.8% under the age of 18, 7.4% from 18 to 24, 33.7% from 25 to 44, 21.7% from 45 to 64, and 10.4% who were 65 years of age or older. The median age was 36 years. For every 100 females there were 99.4 males. For every 100 females age 18 and over, there were 95.9 males.

The median income for a household in the borough was $54,605, and the median income for a family was $63,235. Males had a median income of $41,265 versus $33,045 for females. The per capita income for the borough was $26,590. About 3.2% of families and 4.7% of the population were below the poverty line, including 8.0% of those under age 18 and 4.0% of those age 65 or over.

Government
North Wales has a borough form of government with a mayor and a nine-member borough council. The mayor is Neil McDevitt and the President of Council is Sal Amato.

The borough is part of the Fourth Congressional District (represented by Rep. Madeleine Dean), the 61st State House District (represented by State Representative Liz Hanbidge) and the 12th State Senate District (represented by State Senator Maria Collett).

Police
The North Wales Police Department has four full-time and four part-time officers. The department was headed by Former Police Kenneth Veit, who was the Police Chief from 1973 to 2003. Chief Barry J. Hackert served from 2003 - 2013, at which point Hackert was suspended for involvement in an off-duty assault in Poconos, Pennsylvania. Hackert subsequently resigned. Alex Levy was hired as the new chief in 2013.  In 2022, North Wales Borough hired David Erenius as its new Chief of Police.

Infrastructure

Transportation

Main Street runs northwest-southeast through North Wales, becoming Sumneytown Pike outside the borough, while Walnut Street runs southwest-northeast through North Wales, becoming North Wales Road outside the borough. No state highways pass through North Wales.  U.S. Route 202 passes to the east of North Wales and Pennsylvania Route 63 passes to the northeast of North Wales. Pennsylvania Route 309 passes through Montgomeryville, which is east of the borough, and Pennsylvania Route 363 bypasses North Wales to the north along the Upper Gwynedd-Towamencin township line.  The Pennsylvania Turnpike Northeast Extension (Interstate 476) is located west of North Wales, with connections to the borough via Sumneytown Pike to Exit 31 in the north, as well as North Wales Road to Germantown Pike at Exit 20 to the south.

Public transportation in North Wales is provided by SEPTA. Many North Wales residents commute to Center City Philadelphia by SEPTA Regional Rail's Lansdale/Doylestown Line train, which stops at the North Wales station.  The 1870s-vintage brick railroad station, thoroughly restored in 2010, is open weekday mornings. SEPTA Suburban Bus Route 96 serves North Wales, providing service to the Norristown Transportation Center in Norristown and Lansdale.

Utilities
Electricity and natural gas in North Wales is provided by PECO Energy Company, a subsidiary of Exelon. The North Wales Water Authority provides water and sewer service to North Wales and surrounding townships. Cable, telephone, and internet service in North Wales s provided by Xfinity and Verizon. Trash and recycling collection in North Wales is provided by private haulers including Advanced Disposal, Republic Services, Waste Management, and Whitetail Disposal.

Notable people
John Oates, rock musician, Hall & Oates
William B. T. Trego, historical painter,
Sharon Little, singer-songwriter
Joe McKeehen, professional poker player and 2015 Series of Poker champion

References

External links

Borough of North Wales Official Website.

Populated places established in 1857
Boroughs in Montgomery County, Pennsylvania
Welsh-American culture in Pennsylvania
1857 establishments in Pennsylvania